The Billboard Hot 100 is a chart that ranks the best-performing singles of the United States. Published by Billboard magazine, the data are compiled by Nielsen SoundScan based collectively on each single's weekly physical sales, and airplay. In 2001, there were 14 singles that topped the chart, in 52 issue dates. Although 15 singles claimed the top position throughout the year, group Destiny's Child's "Independent Women Part I" is credited in 2000, and is thus excluded.

During the year, 12 acts had achieved a first U.S. number-one single, namely: Shaggy, Ricardo "RikRok" Ducent,  OutKast, Mystikal, Crazy Town, Rayvon, Lil' Kim, Mýa, Pink, Alicia Keys, Ja Rule, Mary J. Blige, and Nickelback. Destiny's Child, Usher and Shaggy had two number-one singles in 2001.

Janet Jackson's "All for You" is the longest-running single of the year, staying at number one for seven consecutive weeks. 2001 is the first year since 1993 that there has not been at least one number-one hit with a double-digit run. "All for You" is also responsible to give to Jackson the tenth Hot 100 number one of her career; making her the fourth female artist with most number ones in the rock era. Other singles that had a multiple chart run includes Alicia Keys' "Fallin'" and Mary J. Blige's "Family Affair"; both stayed atop for six weeks.

Chart history

Number-one artists

See also
2001 in music
List of Billboard number-one singles
Billboard Year-End Hot 100 singles of 2001

References

Additional sources
Fred Bronson's Billboard Book of Number 1 Hits, 5th Edition
Joel Whitburn's Top Pop Singles 1955-2008, 12 Edition
Joel Whitburn Presents the Billboard Hot 100 Charts: The 2000s
Additional information obtained can be verified within Billboard's online archive services and print editions of the magazine.

2001 record charts
2001